Erigone may refer to:

In Greek mythology:
 Erigone (daughter of Icarius)
 Erigone (daughter of Aegisthus)
 163 Erigone, an asteroid.
 Erigone, a genus of spiders